Christopher Rodonanté Cwej, usually just known as Chris Cwej, is a fictional character from the Virgin New Adventures range of spin-offs based on the BBC science fiction television series Doctor Who. His surname is properly pronounced "Shvay", but he pronounces it "Kwedge" rather than keep correcting people.

His first appearance was in the 1995 novel Original Sin by Andy Lane, with his adjudicate partner Roz Forrester. Adjudicators are the police force of 30th century Earth, which was at that time divided into the Overcity and the Undercity. Chris was born in 2954 to a family who lived in the lower levels of the Overcity. Chris's father, Volsted Kornbluth Cwej, was also an adjudicator.  Chris's father was fairly old when Chris was born, having retired from the Adjudicators the previous year, 2953, after 48 years of service, and he is well over 70 years old when the young Chris meets the Doctor.

Chris's grandfather died when Chris was only five, and Chris cried when he saw his grandfather being put into a coffin. A more distant ancestor, possibly a great-grandfather, was Nathaniel Cwej. Even further back, there was a Cwej involved with the founding of the Adjudicators, and the family have had a long association with the Adjudicators ever since. Chris's accent sounds American, although his home would once have been considered a part of England, and his surname may have a Germanic/Saxon derivation.

Chris is tall, blonde, and muscular, and when he first met the Seventh Doctor and Bernice, he had had a "body bepple" (bodily alteration) which made him look like a teddy bear.

He and Roz were investigating a murder case in Undercity in the year 2975 when they encountered the Doctor and Bernice. They helped the Doctor defeat his old enemy Tobias Vaughn, who had been manipulating human advancement since the 20th century. Having realized the extent of corruption in the Earth Empire and the Adjudicators, Chris and Roz chose to leave in the TARDIS.

Chris and Roz travelled with the Doctor for many adventures. In this eventful period, Chris fathered two daughters: Jasmine Surprise Cwej-Hutchings with Ishtar Hutchings, and iKrissi with Dep of the People. After Roz's death in battle, Chris continued to travel with the Doctor for a short time, but the event had a profound effect on him. During the events of Eternity Weeps, the Doctor's former companion Liz Shaw contracted a deadly virus and begged Chris to kill her, however he was unable to do it. This and the subsequent death of millions of people from the virus caused Chris to question himself and first consider quitting the TARDIS. It took the apparent death of the Doctor in Japan to make him put aside his doubts and help protect the people of the local village from the local warlord, who wanted an alien device in their possession.

Chris leaves the Doctor in the 1997 novel Lungbarrow, the penultimate book in the New Adventures series. In the book, the Doctor and Chris travel to the Doctor's home planet of Gallifrey, where the Doctor faces members of his House, and Chris learns many of the Doctor's hidden secrets. After this, Chris decided to travel alone using a time ring given to him by Romana.

The 1996 book which depicts Chris's sexual encounter with a gay man, Damaged Goods, was written by future executive producer of the series Russell T Davies, whose works often include gay themes. Much like Davies' later introduction to the series proper, Jack Harkness, Cwej opines that sexuality is not an issue where he comes from.

After the Doctor
Chris Cwej subsequently appeared in novels in the Bernice Summerfield range of New Adventures, beginning with Gary Russell's Deadfall, and then in several other appearances.  Deadfall portrayed Cwej as having had his memories (including his adventures with the Doctor) erased by a group known as the Knights of Jeneve.  Dead Romance by Lawrence Miles revealed that Cwej's memories had also been altered by the Time Lords (who were not named as such, but were clearly identified by history and characteristics). They had told him that he had been abducted from 30th century Earth by an "evil renegade", an oblique reference to the Doctor.

Chris continued to work as an agent for the Time Lords: in Dead Romance, he opened a gateway for the Time Lords to invade and destroy a bottle universe version of 1970 Earth. Back in his native universe, in Tears of the Oracle Chris came close to death, and only survived when the Time Lords regenerated him. His new body, to his shock, was short and fat. However, after an encounter with the Ferutu in Twilight of the Gods, he was reverted down his personal time line to age 13 and regained his original body.

Chris next appeared in The Book of the War, an encyclopedia detailing the "War in Heaven" in the Faction Paradox spin-off stories. The Faction Paradox line was based on ideas created for BBC Books' line of Doctor Who novels, and contained many ideas and characters which had their roots in Doctor Who novels or television. However, many of these concepts were changed for legal and creative reasons — for example, the Time Lords became the "Great Houses".

The Book of the War revealed that not only had the Great Houses deliberately altered Cwej's timeline and biodata, they were using alternate copies of him from different timelines as soldiers in their war with the mysterious "Enemy".  These "Cwejen" existed in three types: the original (blond and handsome) "Cwej-Prime", the fat and balding Cwej-Plus, and the monstrous and heavily armored Cwej-Magnus.  Each type existed in multiple iterations, which the Great Houses intended to use as an "Army of One."  One of the Cwejen (implied to be the original) was present at a mysterious incident in the Hollywood Bowl, which may have been a point of contact with the Enemy.

Chris does not appear by name in the subsequent Faction Paradox novels, but a character who strongly matches his description appears as an agent of the Great Houses in Lance Parkin's Warlords of Utopia.  This individual calls himself "Herr Abschrift", German for "Mr. Copy", suggesting that he is one of the Cwejen, a suggestion that is strongly supported by the facts he is described as being a "perfect Aryan" (blond, blue eyed and physically fit), mentions working for something called "Mirraflex" (one of the Great Houses) and is fighting a Great War.

Two of the Cwejen appear as slaves of a Timelord in the Bernice Summerfield audio, "The Adventure of the Diogenes Damsel". They had no knowledge of the original Chris Cwej, and vague knowledge of the Seventh Doctor as a mystical figure.

Chris appeared as the protagonist in an anthology titled Cwej: Down the Middle, released in 2020 by Arcbeatle Press. The book also featured appearances by Iris Wildthyme. Prior to this release, he made an appearance in "Barnyard of the Cyberons", a short story featured in the novelization of Cyberon.

Reception
In Bookwyrm: An Unauthorized & Unconventional Guide to the Doctor Who Novels, Anthony Wilson and Robert Smith praise the introduction of Chris and Roz in Original Sin, saying that the characters are "set up marvellously here. Their backstories are very effective, their contrasting relationship — one cynical and world-weary, the other bright-eyed and bushy-tailed — fantastic, but, more importantly, there's a real sense that there was a plan for both of them going forward."

References

External links

Literary characters introduced in 1995
Fictional bisexual males
Doctor Who spin-off companions
Doctor Who book characters
Faction Paradox
Fictional police officers
Male characters in literature